Progress M-18 was a Russian cargo uncrewed spacecraft which was launched in 1993 to resupply the Mir space station. The thirty-sixth of sixty four Progress spacecraft to visit Mir, it used the Progress-M 11F615A55 configuration, and had the serial number 218. It carried supplies including food, water and oxygen for the EO-13 crew aboard Mir, as well as equipment for conducting scientific research, and fuel for adjusting the station's orbit and performing manoeuvres.

Progress M-18 was launched at 06:41:47 GMT on 22 May 1993, atop a Soyuz-U2 carrier rocket flying from Site 1/5 at the Baikonur Cosmodrome. It was the last Progress spacecraft to be launched on a Soyuz-U2. Following two days of free flight, it docked with the Forward port of Mir's core module at 08:24:44 GMT on 24 May.

Progress M-18 undocked from Mir at 15:58:16 GMT on 3 July; less than half an hour before Soyuz TM-17 docked with the port which it had vacated. It was deorbited around a day later, to a destructive reentry over the Pacific Ocean. Before undocking, a VBK-Raduga capsule launched aboard Progress M-17 had been installed on Progress M-18, and this separated once the deorbit burn was complete. The capsule landed successfully at 17:13 GMT.

See also

1993 in spaceflight
List of Progress flights
List of uncrewed spaceflights to Mir

References

Spacecraft launched in 1993
Progress (spacecraft) missions